Michael Charles Liberman (July 17, 1950) was born to Alvin Liberman and Isabelle Liberman in Storrs, Connecticut.  He is now Director of the Eaton-Peabody Laboratory at the Massachusetts Eye and Ear Infirmary in Boston, and Harold Schuknecht Professor of Otology and Laryngology and Health Sciences and Technology at Harvard Medical School. He is a past president of the Association for Research in Otolaryngology.

His research is concerned with the physiology and anatomy of the auditory nerve and cochlear efferent innervation, as well as noise-induced cochlear pathology; he has published over 100 peer-reviewed papers in these areas. He supervises several graduate students from the Harvard-MIT Speech and Hearing Bioscience and Technology Ph.D. program, as well as post-docs' and residents' research projects.

Education 
Liberman received his AB in Biology from Harvard University in 1972 and went on to receive his Ph.D. in physiology from Harvard University in 1976.

References

External links
 Publications of Charles Liberman 
 Harvard-MIT Speech and Hearing Bioscience and Technology Program 

1952 births
Harvard Medical School alumni
Harvard Medical School faculty
Living people